Cristina Bontaş (later Tăntaru, born December 5, 1973) is a Romanian former artistic gymnast, who competed in international events between 1987 and 1993. Her best events were the floor exercise, the vault, and the all around.  She is a world champion on floor, a double olympic medalist and a six-time world medalist. Bontaş scored a perfect ten on floor in the all around event of the 1989 World Artistic Gymnastics Championships.

Early life and career
She started training at the age of seven at the CSM Oneşti club under coaches Dorin and Mihai Săndulescu. She had a successful junior career, medaling in various competitions. In 1987 her debut at a major international event (International Japan Junior Invitational) brought her four medals, one gold for vault and three silver for the all around, uneven bars and floor. At the 1988 Junior European Championships, Avignon, France she won bronze in the all around event and she managed a fifth place on vault and a seventh place on floor.
The 1988 Junior Friendship Tournament (Druzhba) was another especially successful meet: she won gold for floor, bronze for balance beam and vault and finished fourth in the all around event. In spite of her successful junior career she was the second and therefore the non traveling alternate for the team at the 1988 Olympics.

Senior career

1989–1990
Bontaş' debut as a senior in an international event was at the 1989 Romanian Internationals where she medaled silver for all around, uneven bars and floor and bronze for vault. 1989 was the start of a series of medals for floor and vault in international events. Bontaş was the surprise top Romanian gymnast at the 1989 World Championships, finishing in fourth place in the all around event ahead of the great Daniela Silivaş and just behind the trio of Soviet medalists (Boginskaya, Laschenova and Strazheva). In the all around event she scored a perfect 10 for the floor exercise.  She won bronze on floor and tied for silver on vault with Brandy Johnson.  Bontaş also contributed to the team's silver medal by achieving the third highest average score on her team.
In 1990 she won silver medal on vault at the European Championships in Athens, Greece and placed seventh in the floor and uneven bars events.

1991
At the 1991 World Championships in Indianapolis, United States Bontaş tied for gold for floor with Oksana Chusovitina.  Her performance on the floor exercise based on a musical background of  well-known American songs (e.g., "The Star-Spangled Banner" (USA anthem), "Oh Susanna", "When Johnny Comes Marching Home Again", "Yankee Doodle" and "Deep in the Heart of Texas") energized the crowds. She also won the bronze medal on the all-around event, contributed heavily to the team bronze with the highest average score on her team and placed fourth on vault, seventh on uneven bars and eight on balance beam.

1992 Olympic Games
Together with Lavinia Miloşovici, Gina Gogean, Mirela Paşca, Vanda Hădărean, and Maria Neculiţă, Bontaş was a team member of the Romanian team at the 1992 Olympics in Barcelona, Spain. In the team finals she had once again the highest contributing score of all her colleagues, highlighted by an average 9.95 on the floor exercise. She qualified first in the floor finals, third all around and fifth in the balance beam finals.  She won silver with the team, tied for the bronze medal on floor exercise with Tatiana Gutsu and Shannon Miller, and placed fourth in the all-around and beam finals.

Post retirement
Bontaş retired after the 1992 Olympic games. She first coached in Romania and did some TV commentaries for gymnastics events. Later, she coached in Italy and in Wales. When the contract in Wales was up, Bontaş immigrated to Canada to coach at Hamilton's Mountain Star Gymnastics. She went back to Romania in 1998 to marry, returning to Canada without husband Gabi Tăntaru while they waited for immigration papers. After several months, her husband was able to join her in Canada, he too coaching at Hamilton Mountain Gym Elites (formerly Mountain Star Gymnastics). The couple have a daughter named Elissa, also a gymnast, born April 1999 and a son Eric, born in April 2002.

In September 2003, Bontaş and her husband opened their own gymnastics club in Hamilton, World Class Gymnastics. Here Bontaş was training her pupils for the 2012 Olympic Games. Bontas also recently started an aerobic gymnastics program at her gym which has produced many national team members. .

Competitive history

References

External links 
 
 
 

1973 births
Living people
Sportspeople from Bacău
Romanian female artistic gymnasts
Gymnasts at the 1992 Summer Olympics
Olympic gymnasts of Romania
Olympic silver medalists for Romania
Olympic bronze medalists for Romania
Olympic medalists in gymnastics
Medalists at the World Artistic Gymnastics Championships
Medalists at the 1992 Summer Olympics